Point Pleasant Creek is a tributary of Middle Island Creek,  long, in northwestern West Virginia in the United States.

It flows into Middle Island Creek on the northern boundary of the town of Middlebourne. Upstream of Kidwell, it is paralleled by West Virginia Route 180; for the remainder of its course it is mostly paralleled by West Virginia Route 18.

See also
List of rivers of West Virginia

References 

Rivers of West Virginia
Rivers of Tyler County, West Virginia
Rivers of Wetzel County, West Virginia